Ratha Saptami or Rathasapthami  (  or Magha Saptami) is a Hindu festival that falls on the seventh day (Saptami) in the bright half (Shukla Paksha) of the Hindu month Maagha. It is symbolically represented in the form of the Sun God Surya turning his Ratha (Chariot) drawn by seven horses (representing seven colours) towards the northern hemisphere, in a north-easternly direction. It also marks the birth of Surya and hence celebrated as Surya Jayanti (the Sun-god’s birthday).

Ratha Saptami is symbolic of the change of season to spring and the start of the harvesting season. For most Indian farmers, it is an auspicious beginning of the New Year. The festival is observed by all Hindus in their houses and in innumerable temples dedicated to Surya, across India.

Background

Sun worship is deep rooted in the Vedas of the Hindu religion and its antiquity also relates to several mythologies of the world such as that of China, Egypt and Mesopotamia. The Gayatri Mantra jap – the sacred Vedic chants to Savitr (Sun god) – is recited by the Hindus every day with great reverence. As the puranic Hinduism evolved, the worship of Sun was established.

In the Rig Veda , the sun god's bride seated on a chariot pulled by two steeds is mentioned. This symbolism is therefore common to both Norse mythology and Vedic history.

The relevant verses (translated from Sanskrit by Ralph Griffith) are as follows:
10. Her spirit was the bridal car; the covering thereof was heaven:
     Bright were both Steeds that drew it when Surya approached her husband's, home.
11. Thy Steeds were steady, kept in place by holy verse and Sama-hymn:
     All cars were thy two chariot wheels: thy path was tremulous in the sky,
12. Clean, as thou wentest, were thy wheels wind, was the axle fastened there.
     Surya, proceeding to his Lord, mounted a spirit-fashionied car.

Religious significance
Ratha Saptami is symbolically represented in the form of the Sun God Surya turning his Ratha (Chariot) drawn by seven horses, with Aruṇa as the charioteer, towards the northern hemisphere, in a north-easterly direction. The symbolic significance of the ratha and the seven horses reigned to it is that it represents the seven colours of the rainbow. The seven horses are also said to represent the seven days of a week starting with Sunday, the day of Sun god Surya. The chariot has 12 wheels, which represents the 12 signs (each of 30 degrees) of the Zodiac (360 degrees) and constituting a full year, named Samvatsara. The Sun’s own house is Leo (Simha) and he moves from one house to the next every month and the total cycle takes 365 days to complete. The Ratha Saptami festival seeks the benevolent cosmic spread of energy and light from the Sun God.

Ratha Saptami also marks the gradual increase in temperature across South India and awaits the arrival of spring, which is later heralded by the festival of Gudi Padwa, Ugadi or the Hindu lunar New Year day in the month of Chaitra.

Legends
Ratha Saptami also marks the birth of Surya to sage Kashyapa and his wife Aditi and hence celebrated as Surya Jayanti (the Sun-god’s birthday). A legend is narrated by the Kamboj empire’s King Yashovarma, a noble king who had no heir to rule his kingdom.  On his special prayers to God, he was blessed with a son. The king’s vows did not end with this, as his son was terminally ill.  A saint who visited the king advised that his son should perform the Ratha Saptami pooja (worship) with reverence to rid of his past sins. Once the King’s son performed this, his health was restored and he ruled his kingdom well. It is also said that sage Bhisma breathed his last breath \ day after the Rathasaptahmi day on ashtami

Sun temples

There are Surya temples all across India where Ratha Sapthami is fervently celebrated. However, the most famous one is the World Heritage Site of the Konarak Sun Temple, in Konark, Odisha. Besides Konark, there is another sun temple in Odisha, the Biranchinarayan Temple, Buguda, Ganjam District. There are sun temples in Modhera, Gujarat, created by king Bhimdev of the Chaulukya dynasty, in Arasavalli, Andhra Pradesh and in clusters of Navagraha temples in Tamil Nadu and Assam. The Sun Temple at Martand (Jammu and Kashmir) and Sun Temple of Multan are temples, which were destroyed during Muslim conflicts in the past.

Religious observances

God Vishnu in his form as Surya (the Sun-God) is usually worshipped on this day. Usually, Rathasapthami begins in households with a purification bath (bathing is also done in a river or sea) by holding several Ekka (Calotropis Gigantea) leaves on their head while bathing and chanting a verse which is supposed to invoke the benevolence of the Lord in all that one indulges in during the rest of the year. Argyam or (Tharpanam) (water held in the palms) is offered to the Sun God on this day while chanting hymns are performed to the Sun God. It also involves doing a puja with the ritual Naivedhya (food offering to God), and offering of flowers and fruits. Important prayers offered to the Sun god on this occasion are the Adityahridayam, Gayathri, Suryashtakam, Surya Sahasram namam. The preferred time for the pooja is within one hour after sunrise. In places like Mysore and Melkote, ceremonial processions carry the Surya Mandala - the icon of Surya.

Arka (in Sanskrit, meaning a ray or flash of lightning) leaves,also called Aak in Hindi, Ekka (in Kannada),
Jilledu in Telugu, Erukku in Tamil and Calotropis Gigantea (bowstring hemp) in English. Arka is also a synonym for Surya or Sun. Its significance to Sun God could be compared to the significance of Tulsi (Ocimum tenuiflorum) leaves to Vishnu. Arka leaves are also used for worship of god Ganesha known by the name Arka Ganesha and also for Hanuman worship. Its stems, called samidha (sacrificial offerings of wood) are used for the Yagna ritual as a sacrificial offering to a ritual fire.  Its shape is said to represent the shoulders and chariot of Sun God. Its use during the ritualistic ceremonious bath involves placement of seven leaves - one on the head, two on the shoulders, two on the knees and two on the feet.
On this day, in South India, Kolam is drawn with coloured rice powder depicting a chariot and seven horses as symbolic of the Ratha Saptami. Cowdung cake is also burnt at the centre of this depiction and milk boiled on the fire is offered to the Sun God.
In some of the important Vaishnavite temples such as the Tirumala, Srirangam, Srirangapattana and Melukote,   Ratha Saptami is one of the important festivals of the year. Annual Car Festival of Lord Veera Venkatesha of Sri Venkatramana Temple in Mangalore is held on this day and is famously known as Kodial Teru or Mangaluru Rathotsava.

In Tirumala
On Ratha sapthami a one-day Brahmotsavam is held in Tirumala.On this day, the presiding deity of Lord Malayappa Swamy along with his divine consorts Sridevi and Bhudevi are taken to a procession in Thiru Mada streets in Tirumala. The deities carried out in a jubilant procession around the Thiru mada streets encircling the holy Shrine of Balaji on seven different vahanams(sapthami=seven) .Due to this reason the day of RathaSapthami is called as "Mini-Brahmotsavam" in Tirumala.The day starts with 'Surya prabha vahanam' at round 5.30 am early morning, followed by Chinna Sesha Vahanam at 9 am, Garuda Vahanam by 11 am, Hanuman Vahanam by 1 pm, Chakrasananam by 2 pm, Kalpavriksha Vahanam by 4 pm, Sarvabhoopala Vahanam by 6 pm respectively.The day is ended with the Chandra Prabha Vahanam at 8 pm. Lord Venkateshwara will bless devotees for about 1 hour in each Vahanam (from the start time), in the Thiru Mada Veedhis of Tirumala Tirupati

See also
 Other Sun festivals
 Makara Sankaranti 
 Pongal 
 Chhath

References

January observances
February observances
Hindu festivals
Religious festivals in India